Julius (III) from the kindred Kán (died 1299) was a Hungarian noble from the Siklós branch of the gens Kán as the son of Nicholas I Kán, who served as ispán (comes) of Baranya and Tolna Counties in 1294. His aunt married Peter Tétény. He had a brother, Peter de Siklós, who inherited his estates and functioned as ispán of Baranya County in 1313. His sister was Helena, the spouse of James Győr.

He married Clara Aba (died before 1300), daughter of Palatine Finta Aba.

References

Sources
  Karácsonyi, János (1901). A magyar nemzetségek a XIV. század közepéig ("The Hungarian genera until the middle of the 14th century"). Vol. 2., Hungarian Academy of Sciences. Budapest.
  Zsoldos, Attila (2011). Magyarország világi archontológiája, 1000–1301 ("Secular Archontology of Hungary, 1000–1301"). História, MTA Történettudományi Intézete. Budapest. 

1299 deaths
Julius III
Year of birth unknown
13th-century Hungarian people